Julie Michelle Klinger (born 1983, in Rockford, Illinois) is a geographer at the University of Delaware.

She was formerly Assistant Professor of International Relations at the Frederick S. Pardee School of Global Studies at Boston University. 
She was also an associate director of the Land Use and Livelihoods Initiative (LULI) at the university's Global Development Policy Center (GDP Center).

She studies the geography, geology and geopolitics of development and resource usage. She has carried out in-depth fieldwork in China, Brazil, and other countries that are affected by the mining of rare earth elements.

Klinger is the author of Rare Earth Frontiers: From Terrestrial Subsoils to Lunar Landscapes (2017) which traces the history and use of rare earth elements from the 1880s to the present. Rare Earth Frontiers won the 2017 Meridian Book Award for Outstanding Scholarly Work in Geography given by the American Association of Geographers (AAG) for making an “unusually important contribution to advancing the science and art of geography.”

Education
Julie Michelle Klinger graduated from Sarah Lawrence College with a B.A. in 2006.  While at Sarah Lawrence, she worked with Joshua Muldavin. 
In addition, she earned a certificate from the Nanjing University Center for Chinese and American Studies at Johns Hopkins University in 2007.
She earned her PhD in geography at the University of California, Berkeley in 2015, with the dissertation On the Rare Earth Frontier. Her advisor was Michael J. Watts.

Career

In 2015, Klinger accepted a position at Boston University.  She was an Assistant Professor of International Relations at the Frederick S. Pardee School of Global Studies at Boston University until 2019 where she also served as one of the associate directors of the Land Use and Livelihoods Initiative (LULI) at the university's Global Development Policy Center (GDP Center). In January 2020, she moved to the University of Delaware's Department of Geography and Spatial Sciences and also became affiliated with the university's new Minerals, Materials and Society Program.

Klinger traces the history of rare earth elements, 17 elements which are important to a wide variety of technologies including electronics, telecommunications, medicine, green energy (solar panels, wind turbines and electric vehicles), and defensive systems. 
She traces connections between geology, mining, corporations,  political and military power structures, and communities from the 1880s to the present, around the world.
In the 1960s and 1970s, the Mountain Pass Mine in southern California was the major source of rare earth elements in the world.
Beginning in the 1990s, the Chinese government emphasized policies that led to its dominance in the world market for rare earths, and to severe environmental and human damage in the "sacrifice zone" of Baotou in Inner Mongolia.

Klinger has done fieldwork in a wide variety of communities affected by rare earths mining.  A major area of focus is Inner Mongolia in China.  Another is India.  She has also studied communities in Brazil, Germany, Australia, and the United States. Speaking of her work with the people of Bayan Obo, she says:

Klinger also studies the legal and political implications of proposals to mine rare earths on the moon, which is currently protected under an international treaty.

Rare Earth Frontiers
Klinger received the 2017 Meridian Book Award for Outstanding Scholarly Work in Geography from the American Association of Geographers for her work Rare Earth Frontiers: From Terrestrial Subsoils to Lunar Landscapes. In this book, she examines the production and consumption of the so-called rare-earth elements. Contrary to the name, accessible deposits of these minerals occur around the world, but they are difficult to extract and purify. Processing produces large amounts of radioactive and toxic chemical waste.

Klinger addresses geographical, geological and geopolitical issues.  She examines ways in which the terms "rare earths" and "frontier" reinforce a scarcity myth that is used to justify environmental and human damage.

Klinger encourages readers to consider concrete alternatives that can lead to more sustainable extraction and use of these elements.  She emphasizes that there are known solutions to problems in extracting elements and managing dangerous wastes, and that the issues are less a matter of available technology than of political will.

References

Living people
1983 births
Historians of science
American geographers
Science writers
Rare earth scientists
Pardee School of Global Studies faculty